Durham High School is a public secondary school in Durham, California, United States. Durham High is located in the heart of an agricultural community. Durham High School's current enrollment is around 300 students.

History
Durham High School was founded in 1922

Campus
Durham High School is located on a  campus that also contains the elementary, intermediate and
continuation schools as well as the district offices.

Curriculum

Extracurricular activities
Organizations available to Durham students include Big Sister Little Sister, Block D, California Scholarship Federation, Cinema Club, Girls Block, Harry Potter Club, FFA, and Interact.

Durham High School fields teams in interscholastic competition in baseball, basketball, cross country, football, golf, soccer, swimming, track and field, volleyball and wrestling. They compete in the California Interscholastic Federation Northern Section.

Notable alumni
 Sergio C. Garcia, first undocumented immigrant to be admitted to the State Bar of California

References

External links
 Durham High School

Educational institutions established in 1922
Public high schools in California
High schools in Butte County, California
1922 establishments in California